Owly is an American children's graphic novel series created since 2004 by Andy Runton and published by Top Shelf Productions.

Series overview
The series, which is largely without standard text dialogue making it a pantomime comic, is about the adventures of a gentle owl named Owly who resolves to do good and make friends in his world with the help of his good companions, the clever worm, Wormy, and Scampy, the gluttonous but good hearted chipmunk.  While he faces obstacles in the pursuit of that goal, his faith in the goodness in the world is never disappointed.

Publication history

Collections

Single issues
Top Shelf has published several single issues of Owly, as part of Free Comic Book Day.  
Owly: Splashin' Around was published in 2005
Owly: Breakin' the Ice was published in 2006
Owly: Helping Hands was published in 2007.
Owly: In a Fix! was published in 2008.
Owly: and Friends! was published in 2009

Children's Books
Runton has published two Owly & Wormy children's books.

Awards and recognition

Wins

The Way Home Mini received the 2004 Howard E. Day Prize for outstanding achievement in self-publishing.
 Andy Runton won the 2005 Harvey Award for Best New Talent for Owly.
 Andy Runton won the 2005 Ignatz Award for Promising New Talent for Owly.
 Owly: Flying Lessons received the 2006 Eisner Award in the category "Best Publication for a Younger Audience."
Owly won the 2006 Ignatz Award for Outstanding Series.

Nominations
 2005 Harvey Award nominee for Best Graphic Novel
 2005 Harvey Award nominee for Best New Series
 2005 Eisner Award nominee for Best Publication for a Younger Audience

In other media
A computer-animated short featuring Owly and Wormy was produced by Sprite Animation Studios, and premiered at the San Diego Comic-Con in July 2009. The short was story boarded by Runton himself, and directed by Moto Sakakibara.

Runton contributed a story featuring Owly and Wormy for the 25th issue of Valiant Comics' X-O Manowar in May 2014.

References

External links
Comics section in Andy Runton's site

American comics
2004 comics debuts
Fictional owls
Top Shelf Productions titles
Ignatz Award winners for Outstanding Series
Pantomime comics
Comics about birds
Comics about animals
Comics characters introduced in 2004